Donald Hathaway Valentine Hallock (April 13, 1908 – November 7, 1996) was the eighth Bishop of the Episcopal Diocese of Milwaukee.

Early life and education
He was born in Menominee, Michigan on April 13, 1908, the son of the Reverend Frank Hudson Hallock and Anne Walbridge Brown. He was educated at Carleton College between 1926 and 1927, before studying at the University of Wyoming, from where he earned a Bachelor of Arts in 1930 and a Master of Arts in 1933. He also graduated with a Bachelor of Divinity from Nashotah House Theological Seminary in 1935. He was awarded a Doctor of Divinity from Nashotah House in 1952. He married Ruth Clayre Graham on September 14, 1930, and together had five children.

Ordained Ministry
Hallock was ordained deacon on November 25, 1934, and priest on June 16, 1935, by Bishop Benjamin F. P. Ivins. He was priest-in-charge of Holy Trinity Church in Platteville, Wisconsin between 1935 and 1940. He also served as priest-in-charge of Kemper Memorial Church in Darlington, Wisconsin, Trinity Church in Mineral Point, Wisconsin, and St Michael and All Angels' Church in Shullsburg, Wisconsin between 1938 and 1940. In 1940, he served in the Army during World War II, leaving active duty as a colonel in 1946. He was consequently awarded the Legion of Merit. In 1946 he became rector of St John's Church in Grand Haven, Michigan, while in 1949, he became rector of Grace Church in Hinsdale, Illinois.

Bishop
In October 1951, during the 104th annual council of the diocese, Hallock was elected as Coadjutor Bishop of Milwaukee. He was consecrated on January 10, 1952, by Bishop Benjamin F. P. Ivins. Among his co-consecrators, there were two bishops from the Polish National Catholic Church, including Leon Grochowski. He served as coadjutor bishop from 1952 to 1953 and succeeded as diocesan of Milwaukee on January 1, 1953, a post he retained his retirement in 1973. During his retirement, he assisted at All Saints' Church in Denver, Colorado. He died on November 7, 1996, at his home in Lakewood, Colorado

References

1908 births
1996 deaths
Carleton College alumni
University of Wyoming alumni
People from Menominee, Michigan
20th-century Anglican bishops in the United States
Episcopal bishops of Milwaukee